Juan Casey (born 18 July 1937) is an Argentine sports shooter. He competed in the men's 50 metre free pistol event at the 1976 Summer Olympics.

References

1937 births
Living people
Argentine male sport shooters
Olympic shooters of Argentina
Shooters at the 1976 Summer Olympics
Sportspeople from Buenos Aires Province